Banteay Prei Nokor is an ancient temple complex in the northwest of Kompong Cham, Cambodia.

Known locally as temple of "Wat Nokor in Khum of Kompong Siem", or "Wat Angkor", around 2km from the provincial capital Kampong Cham (city). though a sign at the entrance now officially designates the name of the temple as Nokor Bachey Temple.

Layout 

The complex faces east at a bearing of 84.5°E, and covers 15ha. the site is composed of an outer rectangular laterite wall approximately 420x370m, an inner wall approximately 100x130m.
A large reservoir or Baray some 950 meters long and 480 meters wide is located 350 meters east of the site. Now abandoned, the reservoir area was used in the mid 20th century as a hippodrome, evidence of which can still be seen by visitors.

History 

The monument was built out of sandstone and laterite, and dates from the last years of the reign of Jayavarman VII. It is composed of a central tower surrounded by four laterite wall enclosures. The central tower of the temple of Wat Nokor is decorated with motifs characteristic of Bayon with Buddhist scenes on the pediments.

The temple complex is believed to have been the headquarters of Jayavarman VII for a time, from where he extended his influence over nearby principalities.

It has a number of distinguishing characteristics other than the fact that it is the largest ancient temple complex in Kampong Cham Province. One of these characteristics alludes to the fact that it is built of black sandstone, which causes it to stand out from other temples of the period which are often built of brick or reddish sandstone. The temple has an inscription which is open to visitors to see (and even touch) in the central pavilion. Wat Nokor Bachey boasts a 'Chartres' effect in which a more modern temple of a very different style has been built over and around the original Angkorian structure creating a blend of architectural styles.

There are many legends surrounding the origin of the temple but the most popular one has Oedipal overtones. According to this legend, the temple was built by a king who accidentally killed his father and married his mother. As recounted in the Greek legend, this king was put out by his father after a seer told him that his son would kill him. The son, however, did not die and returned to his kingdom not knowing that his father was the king. After quarreling on the road, the son killed the king and married his queen who was his mother. Upon discovering his crime, the young man built Wat Nokor in penance for his crime.

World Heritage status 
This site was added to the UNESCO World Heritage Tentative List on September 1, 1992 in the Cultural category.

The temples includes many valuable statues and more modern additions, such as the representation of Dam Din.

References

External Links

Buildings and structures in Kampong Cham province
Angkorian sites in Kampong Cham Province